Revolutionary Communist Party is a communist political party in Spain. PCR was formed through a split in PCPE. PCR published La Forja until 2006. Since then the party has largely ceased its public activities. The PCR is an orthodox Maoist organization, being highly critical of the other communist parties of Spain, especially of the importance those parties give to Republicanist positions. The PCR has been linked with the Anti-imperialist Movement.

References

Communist parties in Spain
Far-left politics in Spain